The List of Glacier National Park (U.S.) references identifies English language historic, scientific, ecological, cultural, tourism, social, and advocacy books, journals and studies on the subject of Glacier National Park (U.S.) topics published since 1870 and documented in Glacier related bibliographies and other related references.

Glacier National Park history
The following references are primarily focused on the exploration, creation and history of the park.

 
 
 
 
 
 
 
 
 
 Mark David Spence: Crown of the Continent, Backbone of the World – The American Wilderness Ideal and Blackfeet Exclusion from Glacier National Park. In: Environmental History, Vol. 1, No. 3 (July 1996), p. 29-49

Glacier National Park management
The following references are primarily focused on issues of park management by  the National Park Service.
 
 Neal Christensen, Norma Nickerson: Three Communities Explore Tourism. University of Montana, Institute for Tourism & Recreation Research, September 1996
 Norma Nickerson: What the People think - Glacier National Park and Vicinity. University of Montana, Institute for Tourism & Recreation Research, May 2003

Glacier National Park fisheries
The following references are primarily focused on the history, taxonomy and management of, and angling in the park's fisheries:

Glacier National Park wildlife
The following references are primarily focused on the history, taxonomy and management of the park's wildlife.

Glacier National Park flora
The following references are primarily focused on the history, taxonomy and management of the park's flora.

Glacier National Park ecology
The following references are primarily focused on the ecology of the park.

Glacier National Park geology and geography
The following references are primarily focused on the geology and geography within the park.

Historic structures

Tourism and recreation

The following references are primarily related to promoting tourism and recreational opportunities in the park, to include memoirs and recollections of prominent tourist experiences.

Native Americans in Glacier National Park
The following references are primarily focused on the history of native americans within the park.

Bibliographies

See also
 List of Glacier National Park (U.S.) related articles

Notes

Glacier National Park (U.S.)
Glacier National Park
Glacier National Park